Enrique Iglesias and Pitbull Live! was a co-headlining concert tour by Enrique Iglesias and Pitbull. This is the second time Iglesias and Pitbull tour together, following their 2014-15 joint tour. Latin boy group CNCO was announced as the opening act for most of the American dates.

The tour played nearly 40 shows in the United States and Canada. It placed 24th on Pollstar's annual "Top 200 North American Tours", earning $42.8 million with 422,959 tickets sold.

Critical reception 
Suzette Fernandez from Billboard magazine highlighted Iglesias set, writing that he "does not need extras to impress". Furthermore, she wrote: "His musicians, a good repertoire and the audience chanting his songs are more than enough to make a good evening." Regarding to Pitbull, the writer said that he "heated up the night with a great repertoire" where "dance is mandatory".

Setlist
The following setlists were obtained from the concert held on October 6, 2017; at the Xcel Energy Center in Saint Paul, Minnesota. It does not represent all concerts for the duration of the tour.

Tour dates 

Cancellations and rescheduled shows

Personnel
Production companies

Lighting: Christie Lites
Video: PRG Nocturne
Video Content: Travis Shirley Live Design, Lightborne, Blink, Gravity 
Staging: All Access Staging & Productions
Pyro: Pyrotek Special Effects
Lasers: ER Productions

Pitbull

Tour Producer: Macarena Moreno
Tour Manager: Frida Karlsson
Production Manager: Ernesto Corti
Production Coordinator: Sara Parsons
Stage Manager: Raymundo "Lefty" Barajas
Lighting Designer: Tom Sutherland/DX7 Design Ltd.
Lighting Director & Programmer: Craig Caserta
Media Server Programmer: Nick Hanson
Video Director: Brian "Bubba" Ress
Video Creative Director: Brian Burke
Hippo Tech: Jeffery Cady
Laser Programmer: Lawrence Wright
Laser Operator: John Borschelding

Enrique Iglesias

Production & Show Director: Travis Shirley
Production Manager: Andres Restrepo
Tour Manager: Abel Tabuyo
Production Coordinator: Misty Roberts
Production Assistant: Gala Santos
Stage Manager: Leonardo Roman
Lighting Director: Cassady Miller-Halloran
Associate Lighting Designer: Trevor Ahlstrand
Lighting Programmer: Nate Alves, Trevor Ahlstrand
Lighting Crew Chief: Brandon Leedham
Lighting Techs: Marc Durning, Jacob Alexander, Kyle Lovan, Oliver DeKegel, Austin Bloomfield, David Schmieder, Jon Drlicka
Video Director: Jorge Toro
Video Engineer: Brian "Bubba" Ress
Video Techs: Kenny Ackerman, Taylor Espitee, Tom Cesano, Johnny Martinez, DJ Stokes, Steve Haskins, Martin Jimenez
LED Lead: Taylor Espitee
LED Tech/Camera Operator: Johnny Martinez, Tommy Cesano
Projection Lead: Dino "DJ" Stokes
Catalyst Programmer: Tyler Munson
Laser Tech: Luis Alfredo "Koach" Collazo
Pyro Techs: Gregg Pearson, Amy Stein, Paul Cusato, Dave Harkness
Riggers: Kenneth Mitchell, Jeremy Caldwell
Carpenters: Chuwe Asp, Daniela MacCallum, Deonte Matthews, Jesus Arroyo, Kyle Duarte, Dyland Levely

References

2017 concert tours
Co-headlining concert tours
Enrique Iglesias concert tours
Pitbull (rapper) concert tours